This is a list of notable Haitian Canadians, including both original immigrants who obtained Canadian citizenship and their Canadian descendants.

To be included in this list, the person must have a Wikipedia article showing they are Haitian Canadian, or have references showing they are Haitian Canadian and are notable.

List of notable Haitian Canadians

Artists
 Marie-Denise Douyon - painter, graphic artist
 Leonel Jules - painter
 Guerdy J. Préval - painter

Athletes
 Jennifer Abel - Olympic swimmer
 Joachim Alcine - professional boxer
 Wyn Belotte - professional soccer player
 Patrice Bernier - professional soccer player
 Maxime Boisclair - professional Canadian hockey player
 Francis Bouillon - defenceman for the Montreal Canadiens
 Zachary Brault-Guillard - professional soccer player
 Félix Brillant - professional soccer player
 Dayana Cadeau - Haitian-born Canadian American professional bodybuilder
 Marc Calixte - professional soccer player
 Mikael Cantave - professional soccer player
 Obed Cétoute - professional Canadian Football League player
 Kenny Chery - professional basketball player
 Gilles Colon - former professional Canadian Football League player
 Samuel Dalembert - professional basketball player for the Milwaukee Bucks
 Jonathan David - professional soccer player
 Anthony Duclair - professional hockey player
 Edrick Floréal - Olympic long and triple jumper 
 Raymond Fontaine - professional Canadian Football League player
 Maxime Fortunus - professional ice hockey player
 Jems Geffrard - professional soccer player
 Jean-Luc Grand-Pierre - professional hockey player
Ronald Hilaire - former CFL defensive lineman; current head coach of McGill Redmen
 Schiller Hyppolite - professional boxer
 Yves Jabouin - mixed martial arts fighter
 Dierry Jean - professional boxer
 Osvaldo Jeanty - professional basketball player
 Loudia Laarman - sprinter
 Georges Laraque - professional hockey player
 David Loiseau -  mixed martial arts fighter, the first Haitian-Canadian to fight in the Ultimate Fighting Championship
 Elkana Mayard - professional soccer player
 Josué Mayard - professional soccer player
 Pierre-Rudolph Mayard - professional soccer player
 Olivier Occéan - professional soccer player
 Jean Pascal - professional boxer
 Jimmy-Shammar Sanon - professional soccer player
 Adonis Stevenson - professional boxer, current WBC Light Heavyweight Champion
 Bermane Stiverne - professional boxer
 Bruny Surin - Olympian gold medal winning sprinter
 Claude Vilgrain - professional hockey player

Business
 Ralph Gilles - automobile designer (Chrysler 300)

Entertainment
 Benz Antoine - actor
 Bad News Brown - musician
 Jephté Bastien - film director
 Fabienne Colas - actress, director and producer and head of the Fabienne Colas Foundation
 Anthony Kavanagh - comedian
 Yasmine Mathurin - documentary filmmaker
 Panou - actor
 Quddus - MTV veejay
 Isabelle Racicot - television and radio host
 Sagine Sémajuste - actress
 Wesli - musician

Literature
 Marie-Célie Agnant - author and poet
 Georges Anglade - geographer and writer
 Paul Arcelin - writer
 Gérard Étienne - writer
 Gary Klang - poet and novelist
 Dany Laferrière - novelist
 Nadine Magloire - writer
 Émile Ollivier - writer
 Anthony Phelps - writer

Music
 Marc Antoine - singer
 Athésia - singer-songwriter
 Carmen Brouard - pianist, composer and music educator
 Régine Chassagne - musician with group Arcade Fire
 Dominique Fils-Aimé - musician
 Pierre Gage - singer-songwriter
 Roi Heenok - rapper
 Imposs - rapper
 DL Incognito - rapper
 Kaytranada - electronic musician, producer and DJ
 Yvon Krevé - hip hop artist
 Mélissa Laveaux - musician
 Marie-Josée Lord - opera soprano
 Luck Mervil -  Quebec-based rock singer
 Muzion - rap group
 Wesli - musician
 Édouard Woolley -  tenor, actor, composer, and music educator

Politicians
 Jean Alfred - former MNA for Hull
 Dominique Anglade - MNA for Saint-Henri-Sainte-Anne and leader of the Liberal Party of Quebec
 Vivian Barbot - former MP for Papineau in Montreal
 Frantz Benjamin - MNA for Viau and former Montreal  city councillor for Saint-Michel
 Ulrick Chérubin - former mayor of Amos, Quebec
 Emmanuel Dubourg - MP for Bourassa, former MNA of Viau in Montreal
 Michaëlle Jean - journalist and Canada's first black Governor General
 Firmin Monestime -  mayor of Mattawa, Ontario and the first elected black mayor in Canada

See also

 Canada–Haiti relations
 Haitian diaspora
 List of Haitians
 List of Haitian Americans
 Black Canadians in Montreal

References

External links
The Haitian Community in Canada
Multicultural Canada: Haitians

Ethnic groups in Canada

Caribbean Canadian
Immigration to Quebec